Bezirk Südoststeiermark (South East Styria) is a district of the state of Styria in Austria. It was formed on January 1, 2013 through a merger of the former Radkersburg District and Feldbach District.

Municipalities
Until the end of 2014 Südoststeiermark incorporated 74 municipalities. Since the 1 January Styria municipal structural reform, the district consists of 26 municipalities,
since 2020 the following 25 municipalities:

Bad Gleichenberg
Bad Radkersburg
Deutsch Goritz
Edelsbach bei Feldbach
Eichkögl
Fehring
Feldbach
Gnas
Halbenrain
Jagerberg
Kapfenstein
Kirchbach-Zerlach
Kirchberg an der Raab
Klöch
Mettersdorf am Saßbach
Mureck
Paldau
Pirching am Traubenberg
Riegersburg
Sankt Anna am Aigen
Sankt Peter am Ottersbach
Sankt Stefan im Rosental
Straden
Tieschen
Unterlamm

References

 
Districts of Styria
States and territories established in 2013
2013 establishments in Austria